Laparoscopic hernia repair is the repair of a hiatal hernia using a laparoscope, which is a tiny telescope-like instrument. A hiatal hernia is the protrusion of an organ through its wall or cavity. There are several different methods that can be used when performing this procedure. Among them are the Nissen Fundoplication and the general laparoscopic hernia repair.

Hernia types

There are two types of hiatal hernias. The two different types of hiatal hernias that are relevant to this surgery are rolling hiatal hernias and sliding hiatal hernias. A type II, rolling hiatal hernia, is when the gastric fundus is herniated, but the cardia portion of the stomach remains still. A type 1, or sliding hiatal hernia, is when the gastroesophageal junction and the cardia portion of the stomach move through the posterior mediastinum.

Methods

There are several different methods when performing a laparoscopic hernia repair. A few of these are the fundoplication and the general laparoscopic hernia repair.

In bariatric surgery, hernias are repaired laparoscopically anteriorly, rather than posteriorly as in the fundoplication procedure.  This general laparoscopic procedure was introduced by Sami Salem Ahmad from Germany.
The Nissen fundoplication procedure was first performed by Rudolph Nissen in 1955.

Laparoscopic hernia repair

A laparoscopic hernia repair is when the hiatal hernia is corrected using a covering for the mesh that is used to repair the weakened area. The defect is then measured and the mesh is stapled into place. A benefit of performing Laparoscopic hernia repair is shorter recovery times compared to other methods. However, it is a longer procedure than most other methods of repair.

Nissen fundoplication

The Nissen fundoplication procedure consists of a 360 degree transabdominal fundoplication. A fundoplication is the suturing of the fundus located in the stomach and around the esophagus. The procedure itself is performed with the patient in a low lithotomy position at approximately 25 degrees. After the esophagus is mobilized, the crura is moved posteriorly using sutures to make room for a French bougie. When in place, a wrap is created and sutured to the esophagus and to the right crus at the hiatus as well. After this is performed, the bougie is removed and the wrap is further anchored with additional sutures. The trocar sites are then closed.

Complications

When performing a laparoscopic hernia repair, patients undergoing the procedure face complications such as postoperative urinary retention (PUR).
Another potential complication is requiring a second hernia repair after previously having one at an earlier time.
Some complications can arise from the need for general anesthesia in having an open ventral hernia repair. Inherent risks are associated with the use of anesthesia.

General complications that can occur using any method of hernia repair are:
 problems with anesthesia dosage
 difficulty swallowing because the stomach is too high up or esophagus is wrapped too tightly
 heartburn
 excessive gas
 infection or bleeding
 esophagus moving out of wrap causing lower esophageal sphincter to not be supported

General laparoscopic procedure

Some complications that can arise from the general laparoscopic procedure are PUR (postoperative urinary retention) 

Other complications that can arise during this procedure are:
 nerve injury that results in prolonged pain
 recurrence of hernia
 hematomas
 excessive bleeding that leads to the switch to open hernia repair
 wound infection

Nissen fundoplication procedure

Complications that can arise form this procedure are:
 dysphagia
 bloating
 other gastrointestinal symptoms

Overall, the complication rate for this procedure is about 10% to 20%. The failure rate, or inability to repair the hernia, is approximately 5%.

Outcomes
The outcomes of laparoscopic hernia repair versus open hernia repair support laparoscopic hernia repair as the method of choice.
Outcomes from having laparoscopic hernia repair are:
 A lower morbidity rate
 Low mortality rate
 Quarter inch to half an inch incisions that result in three small scars

A laparoscopic hiatal hernia repair results in a hospital stay of approximately 36 to 48 hours after the procedure has been performed

Benefits

Laparoscopic hernia repair has several benefits compared to performing Open hernia repairs.

Benefits are:
 Three small scars at the point of incision compared to one large scar
 Reduced post-operative pain
 Shorter recovery time
 Shorter hospital stay

See also
 Hiatus hernia

References

Surgical procedures and techniques
Gastroenterology